The year 1948 in television involved some significant events.
Below is a list of television-related events during 1948.



Events 
 (undated) - The Ziv Company creates Ziv Television Programs as a subsidiary specializing in the production of original television programs for syndication.
 February 9 - WLWT, Cincinnati, Ohio, begins commercial broadcasting, changing its call letters from experimental station W8XCT.
 March 4 - First American television ratings are released by C. E. Hooper.
 March 20 – Renowned Italian conductor Arturo Toscanini makes his television debut, conducting the NBC Symphony Orchestra in the U.S. in a program featuring the works of Richard Wagner.
 April 3 – Beethoven's Symphony No. 9 is played on television in its entirety for the first time in a concert featuring Toscanini conducting the NBC Symphony Orchestra. The chorus is conducted by Robert Shaw.
 May 3 – The first network nightly newscast, CBS Television News, debuts on CBS with Douglas Edwards as journalist.
 June 21 - The first network telecasts of political conventions from Philadelphia.
 July 29 – The BBC Television Service begins its coverage of the 1948 Olympic Games in London by broadcasting the opening ceremony. From now until the closing ceremony on August 14 the BBC will broadcast an average three and a half hours a day of live coverage from the games, using a special coaxial cable linking the main venue at Wembley Stadium to the television service's base at Alexandra Palace. This is the most ambitious sustained outside broadcast yet attempted by the BBC and is completed without serious problems.
 August 25 – First-ever congressional hearing is televised: "Confrontation Day" between Alger Hiss and Whittaker Chambers before the House Un-American Activities Committee (HUAC)
 November 4 - Moscow TV facility adopted a new 625 line PAL television standard.
November 25 - The earliest known national telecast of the Macy's Thanksgiving Day Parade is broadcast by CBS.
 November 29
 Roller Derby is broadcast from NY on the CBS television network.
 The television puppet show series Kukla, Fran and Ollie is transferred to the NBC Midwest Network.
 December 18 — WDSU TV channel 6, NBC affiliate, Becomes the first station in the Deep South in New Orleans, Louisiana
 CBS begins network programming.
 ABC establishes its first television station in New York.
 Television manufacturing begins in Canada.
 Telecasts of the NBC Symphony Orchestra, begin until 1954.
 The number of homes in the U.S. that own a television set reaches one million.

Debuts 
 January 5 – Television Newsreel (UK) is first shown on the BBC Television Service (1948–1954).
 April 15 - For Your Pleasure debuts on NBC.
 April 18 - The ABC television network begins operation.
 April 22 - WTVR-TV, Richmond, Virginia, begins broadcasting on Channel 6. WTVR is the first TV station south of Washington, D.C., giving it the nickname "The South's first Television Station."
 April 27 - KSTP-TV, Saint Paul, Minnesota, signs on the air as an NBC affiliate, the first TV station in Minnesota.
 June 8 – Milton Berle becomes the first United States television star with the debut of Texaco Star Theater (later The Milton Berle Show) broadcast by NBC (1948–1953).
 June 9 - WBZ-TV, Boston, Massachusetts, begins broadcasting on Channel 4. WBZ is New England's first television station.
 June 20 – Toast of the Town, a variety series hosted by Ed Sullivan, premieres on CBS, with guests Dean Martin and Jerry Lewis (later renamed, The Ed Sullivan Show) (1948–1971).
 July 1 – Mark Goodson's first game series Winner Take All premieres on CBS (1948–1952).
 August 10 – Candid Microphone (renamed Candid Camera in 1949) debuts on ABC (1948 – present).
 September 8 - Girl About Town debuts on NBC.
 September 29 - WSB-TV, Atlanta, Georgia, begins broadcasting on Channel 8.
 November 15 - The Adventures of Oky Doky premieres (1948–1949).
 November - Super Circus premieres (1948-49 locally on WENR, 1949-1956 nationwide)
 Amanda (1948–1949).
 The Bigelow Show premieres (1948–1949).
 Champagne and Orchids (1948–1949).
 Child's World debuts (1948–1949).
 Actors Studio (1948–1950).
 Cartoon Teletales (1948–1950).
 The Alan Dale Show premieres (1948–1951).
 Club Seven (1948–1951).

Television programs

Programs ending during 1948

Births 
 January 2 - Judith Miller, American journalist
 January 5 - Ted Lange, actor, director (The Love Boat)
 January 12 - Martha Teichner, American television news correspondent
 January 14 - Carl Weathers, actor (Tour of Duty, Arrested Development)
 January 16 - John Carpenter, actor
 January 18 - M. C. Gainey, actor (Against the Law, Lost)
 January 22 - Velton Ray Bunch, composer
 January 29
Cristina Saralegui, Cuban-American talk show host and actress
Marc Singer, Canadian actor
February 4 - Alice Cooper, actor and singer
February 5 
Barbara Hershey, actress
Christopher Guest, actor
Tom Wilkinson, actor
February 14 - Pat O'Brien, American author and radio host
February 15 - Tino Insana, actor (died 2017)
February 18 - Peter Lance, American journalist
February 20 - Jennifer O'Neill, actress
February 22   
John Ashton, actor
Joe Cortese, actor
February 24 - Dennis Waterman, actor
February 28
Bernadette Peters, actress and singer
Mercedes Ruehl, actress
February 29 
Ken Foree, actor
Gérard Darmon, actor
Kerry Walker, actress
March 3 - Brian Cummings, actor
March 6 - Anna Maria Horsford, actress (Amen, The Wayans Bros.)
March 13 - Robert S. Woods, actor (One Life to Live)
March 14 - Billy Crystal, actor, comedian (Soap, Saturday Night Live)
March 20 - John de Lancie, actor (Star Trek: The Next Generation)
March 22 - Wolf Blitzer, American journalist
March 24 - Adrian Shergold, director
March 25 - Bonnie Bedelia, actress (Love of Life)
March 26 - Steven Tyler, actor
March 28 - Dianne Wiest, actress (Law & Order)
March 30 - Justin Deas, actor (As the World Turns, Santa Barbara, Guiding Light)
March 31 - Rhea Perlman, actress (Cheers)
April 6 - Patrika Darbo, actress (Step by Step)
April 7 - Michael Hirsh, Canadian producer
April 12 
Jeremy Beadle, English presenter (died 2008)
Rita Braver, American television news correspondent
April 13 - Bob Kur, American television journalist
April 19 - Andrew Scheinman, American film and television producer
April 20 - Gregory Itzin, actor (24) (died 2022)
April 25 - Freda Foh Shen, actress (Elementary, Silk Stalkings, Gideon's Crossing)
April 27  
Kate Pierson, singer
Si Robertson, American television personality
April 30 
Perry King, actor (Riptide)
Allan Arkush, producer
May 3 
Chris Mulkey, actor
Peter Oosterhuis, golfer
May 6 - Paul Linke, actor (CHiPs)
May 8 
Stephen Stohn, American-Canadian lawyer and producer
Gale Tattersall, producer
May 10 - Meg Foster, actress
May 11 - Joe Bodolai, writer (died 2011)
May 12 - Lindsay Crouse, actress
May 14 
Walter Olkewicz, actor (died 2021)
Rich Correll, actor
May 17 - Jim Gardner, broadcaster
May 19 - Grace Jones, actress
May 21 
Carol Potter, actress (Beverly Hills, 90210)
Jonathan Hyde, actor
May 23 - Gary McCord, golfer
May 26 - Stevie Nicks, singer
May 27 - Ken Lerner, actor
June 1 - Powers Boothe, actor (died 2017)
June 2 - Jerry Mathers, actor (Leave It to Beaver)
June 11 - Stephen Schnetzer, actor (Another World) 
June 19 - Phylicia Rashad, actress (The Cosby Show) 
June 20 - Tina Sinatra, businesswoman 
June 25 - Jesse Frederick, singer 
June 28 - Kathy Bates, actress 
June 29 - Fred Grandy, actor (The Love Boat) 
July 2 - Saul Rubinek, actor 
July 12 
Jay Thomas, actor (died 2017) 
Richard Simmons, American fitness personality 
July 13 - Daphne Maxwell Reid, actress (The Fresh Prince of Bel-Air) 
July 15 - Anne Sinclair, French television and radio interviewer
July 16 - Rubén Blades, actor 
July 19 - Beverly Archer, actress (Mama's Family, Major Dad) 
July 22 - Neil Hardwick, British-born Finnish theatre and TV director
July 25 - Eren Ozker, American puppeteer (died 1993) 
July 28 - Georgia Engel, actress (The Mary Tyler Moore Show) (died 2019) 
July 30 - Jean Reno, actor
August 2 - Dennis Prager, talk show host 
August 5 - Carole Laure, actress 
August 13 - Merrill Markoe, writer
August 14 
Joseph Marcell, English actor (The Fresh Prince of Bel-Air) 
Lou Wagner, actor 
August 18 
Maureen Garrett, actress (Guiding Light, Ryan's Hope) 
Sean Scanlan, actor 
Grainger Hines, actor 
August 19 - Deana Martin, actress 
August 20 - John Noble, Australian actor (Fringe, Sleepy Hollow) 
August 23 - Steve Edwards, American talk show host
August 24 - John Beard, American news anchor 
August 30 - Lewis Black, American actor 
September 7 
Susan Blakely, actress (Rich Man, Poor Man) 
Roz Abrams, American television news journalist 
September 13 
Nell Carter, actress, singer (Gimme a Break!) (died 2003) 
Clyde Kusatsu, actor 
September 16 - Susan Ruttan, actress (L.A. Law) 
September 17 - John Ritter, actor, comedian (Three's Company) (died 2003) 
September 19 - Jeremy Irons, actor 
September 20 - Joanna Cameron, actress (died 2021) 
September 24 
Phil Hartman, Canadian actor, comedian (Saturday Night Live) (died 1998) 
Gordon Clapp, actor (NYPD Blue)
September 25 - Mimi Kennedy, actress (Homefront) 
September 26 - Bruce Sudano, songwriter 
September 27 
Michele Dotrice, English actress 
Tom Braidwood, actor 
A Martinez, soap opera actor and singer 
September 29 - Bryant Gumbel, journalist and sportscaster 
October 2 - Avery Brooks, actor (Spenser: For Hire, A Man Called Hawk, Star Trek: Deep Space Nine) 
October 5 - Sal Viscuso, actor (M*A*S*H) 
October 6 - Frances Tomelty, actress 
October 10 - Carol Marin, journalist 
October 12 - Eli Danker, actor 
October 17 - George Wendt, actor (Cheers) 
October 19 
Pat Klous, actress (The Love Boat, Flying High) 
Dave Mallow, actor 
October 21 
Dick Christie, actor (Small Wonder) 
Tom Everett, actor 
October 23 - Brian Ross, journalist 
October 24 - James Whitmore, Jr., actor 
October 28 - Telma Hopkins, singer, actress (Family Matters) 
October 29 - Kate Jackson, actress (Charlie's Angels, Scarecrow and Mrs. King) 
November 1 - Anna Stuart, actress 
November 7 - James Houghton, actor (Knots Landing) 
November 10 - Aaron Brown, journalist 
November 11 - Vincent Schiavelli, actor (died 2005) 
November 14 - Robert Ginty, actor (died 2009) 
November 15 - Robert G. Beckel, commentator (died 2022) 
November 20 
Richard Masur, actor 
Harlee McBride, actress
November 21 - Lonnie Jordan, singer 
November 25 - Storm Field, American television meteorologist
November 30 - Larry Bishop, actor 
December 3 - Ozzy Osbourne, English singer, songwriter and actor (The Osbournes)
December 6 - JoBeth Williams, actress 
December 7 - Tony Thomas, producer
December 21 
Samuel L. Jackson, actor (Pulp Fiction) 
Barry Gordon, actor 
December 22 
Noel Edmonds, English television presenter 
Steve Garvey, Football player who played himself on an episode of the NBC sitcom Just Shoot Me! in 1999
December 25 - Barbara Mandrell, singer 
December 26 - Candy Crowley, American news anchor 
December 31 - Donna Summer, singer-songwriter (died 2012)

References

External links